The discography of Swans, an American experimental rock band, consists of fifteen studio albums, eleven live albums, seven compilation albums, eleven EPs and fifteen singles.

Studio albums

Live albums

Fundraiser albums

Compilation albums

Extended plays

Music videos 
 "A Screw" (1985)
 "New Mind" (1987)
 "Love Will Tear Us Apart" (1988)
 "Saved" (1989)
 "Love of Life" (1992)

Singles

Notes

References

External links 
 

Discography
Discographies of American artists
Rock music group discographies